"Adventures in Baby-Getting" is the third episode of the twenty-fourth season of the American animated television series The Simpsons. It was set to air on the Fox network in the United States on October 21, 2012, but due to Game 6 of the 2012 National League Championship Series, it was pushed to November 11, finally airing on November 4. In the UK and Ireland, the episode aired on Sky 1 on 31 March 2013 with 713,000 viewers, making it the sixth most watched program that week. In Newfoundland and Labrador, Canada, it aired on the original date of October 21 on CJON-DT.

Plot

Opening (Homer Votes 2012 short with changes) 
It is election day in Springfield and Homer is on his way to the voting booths at Springfield Elementary School, all the while showing his bitterness about voting. Arriving at the voting booths, Homer is initially unable to decide whether he should vote for Barack Obama or Mitt Romney, as both have their flaws. Eventually, Homer votes for Romney, but is shocked to find that he got a medical deduction for a personality implant, he has six wives all named Ann, and the government paid him taxes for five years. Before Homer can rush out of the booth to tell the press, he is sucked into a tube and gets outsourced to a factory somewhere in China, where US flags are being made. Homer is initially satisfied with the outcome because he has got a steady job until Selma comes out of the tube.

Main plot 
Homer's neglect to fix a dripping faucet causes the water to seep underground and create a massive cavern underneath the town square. The ground eventually caves in, just as Marge drives her car into the hole. She and the kids manage to get out, but Marge is unable to recover her car as the hole is soon filled up with useless items and covered with an asphalt layer, burying the car. With the car gone, Marge purchases a new one, a Tissan Sensibla, but she dislikes it. At first she is reluctant to reveal her reasons, but eventually tells Homer that the five seater car destroys her chances at having another baby, which she secretly wants. Homer appears to support her desire, but he is secretly horrified, feeling that three kids are enough for him to handle. Homer and Marge later find that their chances at having a baby are still nonexistent, as Homer's sperm are dead. However, Moe reveals that Homer sold some of his sperm to the Shelbyville Fertility Clinic a few years back. Homer and Marge head for the clinic, and Homer tries to divert Marge's attention by taking a historic route and stopping by several places. This plan fails, prompting him to admit his true feelings about another baby to Marge, and that he actually never wanted to be a father. This angers her and the two drive home. During a stop at a restaurant, however, Homer observes a family of six and finds that the father is enjoying himself with the fourth, youngest child. Changing his mind, he and Marge return to their original plan and arrive at the clinic. There, Marge is horrified to learn that Homer sold a lot of sperm to the clinic, resulting in a huge number of Homer-like babies. This forces her to tell Homer that they should probably wait, and Homer agrees. He takes the family to a drive-in movie and spots a set of newborn septuplets who resemble him, and he and they yell "D'oh!" at the same time.

Subplot
Bart and Milhouse find a message dropped by Lisa that reads in cursive, "The five boxing wizards jump quickly." They also see Lisa sneak off into a taxicab. Intrigued, the two recruit Nelson and Ralph, both previous boyfriends of Lisa's, in hopes of profiling her mind to find the meaning of the message. While following Lisa, Nelson and Ralph find another message, also in cursive, saying, "Sphinx of black quartz, judge my vow." The group's efforts in finding out what the messages mean go nowhere, and by this time, Principal Skinner, who is concerned from Lisa's strange disappearances, has joined them. Skinner deduces that the paper used for both messages only belongs to the previous principal of Springfield Elementary School, Meredith Milgram. The five visit her house and find Lisa there. To the kids' dismay, Lisa reveals she was learning cursive writing–a topic that the school cannot afford to teach. The two messages were mere practice sentences, as both consisted of every letter of the alphabet. The credits are also written in cursive

Reception

Ratings
The episode earned a 2.6 in the 18–49 demographic and was watched by a total of 5.54 million viewers becoming the most watched show in the 18–49 demographic and in total viewers that night in the Animation Domination lineup.

Critical reception
The episode received mixed reviews. At The A.V. Club, Robert David Sullivan gave the episode a C rating, saying, "After the annual 'Treehouse Of Horror' and a break for the World Series, The Simpsons is back with an episode that’s not quite as sour as its season opener but is still disappointingly thin." He especially criticized the subplot with Lisa, commenting that it was "[not] any funnier than it sounds."

References

External links

 
 "Adventures in Baby-Getting"  at theSimpsons.com

2012 American television episodes
The Simpsons (season 24) episodes
Jeff Gordon